Orimonte is an opera in three acts and a prologue by the Italian composer Francesco Cavalli with a libretto by Niccolò Minato. It was first performed at the Teatro San Cassiano, Venice on February 23, 1650.

References
Source
Brenac, Jean-Claude, Le magazine de l'opéra baroque online at perso.orange.fr  Retrieved 9 September 2011

Operas
Operas by Francesco Cavalli
1650 operas
Opera world premieres at the Teatro San Cassiano
Italian-language operas